North Dakota Highway 58 (ND 58) is a  east–west state highway in the U.S. state of North Dakota. ND 58's southern terminus is at ND 200 northeast of East Fairview, and the northern terminus is at ND 1804 in Buford.

Major intersections

References

058
Transportation in McKenzie County, North Dakota
Transportation in Williams County, North Dakota